Korangi is a human settlement in Sindh, Pakistan.

Korangi may also refer to:

In Pakistan
Korangi Creek Cantonment, a cantonment in Pakistan.
Korangi Creek Industrial Park, an industrial park in Pakistan
Korangi District, an administrative unit of Sindh, Pakistan
Korangi Industrial Area, an industrial area near Karachi, Pakistan
Korangi J Area, a town near Karachi, Pakistan
Korangi railway station, a railway station in Pakistan
Korangi Town, a town in Pakistan
 Korangi District, a district in Sindh, Pakistan

Other places
Coringa, East Godavari district, a village in  Andhra Pradesh, India, also known as Koringa

See also